P'yŏngsan station is a railway station located in P'yŏngsan-ŭp P'yŏngsan County, North Hwanghae province, North Korea. It serves as the junction point of two railway lines – the P'yŏngbu Line, which connects P'yŏngyang to Kaesŏng (and, formerly, Pusan, via Dorasan), and the Ch'ŏngnyŏn Ich'ŏn Line, which runs from P'yŏngsan to Sep'ŏ where it  connects to the Kangwŏn Line.

History
Originally called Namch'ŏn station, it was opened by the Chosen Government Railway on 20 December 1931.

References

Railway stations in North Korea
Pyongsan County